ASO Chlef, an Algerian professional association football club, has gained entry to Confederation of African Football (CAF) competitions on several occasions. They have represented Algeria in the Champions League on two occasions and the Confederation Cup on two occasions.

History
ASO Chlef whose team has regularly taken part in Confederation of African Football (CAF) competitions. Qualification for Algerian clubs is determined by a team's performance in its domestic league and cup competitions, ASO Chlef have regularly qualified for the primary African competition, the CAF Champions League, by winning the Ligue Professionnelle 1. ASO Chlef have also achieved African qualification via the Algerian Cup. The first continental participation was in 2006 in the CAF Confederation Cup after winning the Algerian Cup, and the first match was against AS Douanes and ended with a draw 0–0, As for the biggest win was in 2012 against ASFA Yennenga 4–1, and biggest loss in 2007 against Al-Merrikh 3–0.

CAF competitions

Statistics

By season
Information correct as of 14 September 2012.
Key

Pld = Played
W = Games won
D = Games drawn
L = Games lost
F = Goals for
A = Goals against
Grp = Group stage

PR = Preliminary round
R1 = First round
R2 = Second round
SR16 = Second Round of 16
R16 = Round of 16
QF = Quarter-final
SF = Semi-final

Key to colours and symbols:

By competition

In Africa
:

Statistics by country
Statistics correct as of game against Espérance ST on September 14, 2012

CAF competitions

African competitions goals
Statistics correct as of game against Espérance ST on September 14, 2012

Hat-tricks

Two goals one match

African opponents by cities

Notes

References

Africa
Algerian football clubs in international competitions